Elsmore can refer to:

 Elsmore, New South Wales, Australia
 Elsmore, Kansas, United States
 Philip Elsmore (born 1937), British television presenter and actor
 Nik Elsmore (born 1977), British rally driver
 Guy Elsmore (born 1966), British Anglican priest

See also
 Elmore (disambiguation)
 Elsmere (disambiguation)
 Ellesmere (disambiguation)